Thomas Carolus "Thom" de Graaf (born 11 June 1957) is a Dutch politician of the Democrats 66 (D66) party and jurist. He is the Vice-President of the Council of State since 1 November 2018.

De Graaf attended the City Gymnasium Nijmegen from April 1969 until May 1975 and applied at the Radboud University Nijmegen in June 1975 majoring in Law obtaining a Bachelor of Laws degree in June 1977 and worked as a student researcher before graduating with a Master of Laws degree in July 1981. De Graaf served on the Municipal Council of Nijmegen from May 1978 until April 1979. De Graaf worked as a researcher at the Radboud University Nijmegen and the Centre for Parliamentary History from July 1981 until September 1985. De Graaf worked as a civil servant for the Ministry of the Interior from September 1985 until May 1994 for the department for Law Enforcement from September 1985 until February 1986 and as Deputy Director-General of the department for Legislative Affairs from February 1986 until August 1988 and as Deputy Director-General of the department for Legal Affairs from August 1988 until September 1991 and as Deputy Director-General of the department for Law Enforcement from September 1991 until May 1994. De Graaf served on the Municipal Council of Leiden from April 1990 until May 1994.

De Graaf was elected as a Member of the House of Representatives after election of 1994, taking office on 17 May 1994 serving as a frontbencher and spokesperson for the Interior, Kingdom Relations, and Law enforcement and deputy spokesperson for Foreign Affairs and European Affairs. After the Parliamentary leader of the Democrats 66 in the House of Representatives Gerrit Jan Wolffensperger announced that he was stepping down as Parliamentary leader in the House of Representatives following increasing criticism on his leadership, the Democrats 66 leadership approached De Graaf as his successor, De Graaf accepted and became the Parliamentary leader in the House of Representatives, taking office on 21 November 1997. After the election of 1998 the new Leader of the Democrats 66 Els Borst was elected as a Member of the House of Representatives and became the Parliamentary leader, taking office on 19 May 1998. Following the cabinet formation of 1998 Borst opted to remain Minister of Health, Welfare and Sport in the Cabinet Kok II and unexpectedly announced that she was stepping down as Leader. De Graaf announced his candidacy to succeed her. De Graaf won the leadership election defeating fellow frontbencher Roger van Boxtel and was elected as Leader and Parliamentary leader, taking office on 30 May 1998. For the election of 2002 De Graaf served as the  Lijsttrekker (top candidate). The Democrats 66 suffered a big loss, losing 7 seats and fell back as the seventh largest party and now had 7 seats in the House of Representatives. For the election of 2003 De Graaf served for a second time as Lijsttrekker. The Democrats 66 suffered another loss, losing 1 seat and now had 6 seats in the House of Representatives. On 22 January 2003 De Graaf announced he was stepping down as Leader and Parliamentary leader taking responsibility for the defeat but continued to serve in the House of Representatives as a frontbencher chairing the parliamentary committee for Kingdom Relations. Following the cabinet formation of 2003 De Graaf was appointed as Deputy Prime Minister and Minister for Governmental Reform and Kingdom Relations in the Cabinet Balkenende II, taking office on 27 May 2003. On 23 March 2005 De Graaf resigned after a proposed constitutional reform on elected-mayors was rejected by the Senate.

De Graaf semi-retired from active politics and became active in the public sector and occupied numerous seats as a nonprofit director on several supervisory boards (Centre for Parliamentary History, Consumers' League and the Anne Vondeling prize) and served on several state commissions and councils on behalf of the government (Public Pension Funds APB, De Koning Commission, National Committee for 4 and 5 May, Netherlands Film Fund and the Advisory Council for Spatial Planning). De Graaf also worked as a sport administrator for the Royal Dutch Football Association. De Graaf also served as a professor of Ethics for the Royal Marechaussee at the Royal Military Academy from July 2005 until September 2010. In December 2006 De Graaf was nominated as Mayor of Nijmegen, taking office on 8 January 2007. In January 2012 De Graaf was nominated as Chairman of the Executive Board of the Universities of Applied Sciences association, he resigned as Mayor the same day he was installed Chairman from serving from 1 February 2012 until 1 November 2018. De Graaf was elected as a Member of the Senate after the Senate election of 2011, taking office on 7 June 2011 serving as a frontbencher chairing the parliamentary committee for Kingdom Relations and spokesperson for the Interior, Kingdom Relations, European Affairs, Defence and Immigration and Asylum Affairs. After the Senate election of 2015 De Graaf was selected as Parliamentary leader of the Democrats 66 in the Senate, taking office on 9 June 2015. In June 2018 De Graaf was nominated as Vice-President of the Council of State, he resigned as Parliamentary leader on 26 June 2018 and as a Member of the Senate on 20 September 2018 and was installed as Vice-President of the Council of State, taking office on 1 November 2018.

Early life and education 
De Graaf was born in Amsterdam and studied law at the Catholic University Nijmegen where he obtained his LL.M. in 1981. He was a member of the House of Representatives in the period 1994-2003, where he also held the post of party leader and faction chairperson for D66 from 1997 onward. He sat as vice-chairman in the parliamentary inquiry commission that looked into the investigative methods used by the Dutch inter-regional police force, leading to the resignation in 1994 of the Minister for Internal Affairs, Ed van Thijn.

Political career 
De Graaf served in the second Balkenende cabinet as Deputy Prime Minister and Minister for Government Reform and Kingdom Relations from 23 May 2003 until 23 March 2005. In 2005, de Graaf resigned, after the introduction of democratically elected mayors had been rejected in the Senate, with a deciding vote cast by the Labour Party faction under guidance by Ed van Thijn. The proposal was especially important as it had become a symbol of the government reform that D66 had wanted since its creation. Alexander Pechtold took his place in the cabinet.

From 8 January 2007 until 1 February 2012, De Graaf was mayor of Nijmegen, as successor of Guusje ter Horst. De Graaf's father, Theo de Graaf, was a Catholic People's Party member of parliament and from 1968 until 1977 mayor of Nijmegen. Since 1 February 2012 Thom de Graaf is President of the HBO-raad.

Decorations

References

External links

Official
  Mr. Th.C. (Thom) de Graaf Parlement & Politiek
  Mr. Th.C. de Graaf (D66) Eerste Kamer der Staten-Generaal

 

 
 

 
 

 

 

1957 births
Living people
Democrats 66 politicians
Deputy Prime Ministers of the Netherlands
Dutch management consultants
Dutch nonprofit directors
Dutch nonprofit executives
Dutch Roman Catholics
Dutch school administrators
Dutch sports executives and administrators
Dutch trade association executives
Knights of the Holy Sepulchre
Academic staff of Koninklijke Militaire Academie
Leaders of the Democrats 66
Mayors of Nijmegen
Members of the House of Representatives (Netherlands)
Members of the Senate (Netherlands)
Ministers of Kingdom Relations of the Netherlands
Ministers without portfolio of the Netherlands
Municipal councillors of Leiden
Municipal councillors of Nijmegen
Officers of the Order of Orange-Nassau
Politicians from Amsterdam
People from Leiden
People from Lisse
People from Nijmegen
Radboud University Nijmegen alumni
Academic staff of Radboud University Nijmegen
Vice-presidents of the Council of State (Netherlands)
20th-century Dutch civil servants
20th-century Dutch educators
20th-century Dutch jurists
20th-century Dutch politicians
21st-century Dutch businesspeople
21st-century Dutch civil servants
21st-century Dutch educators
21st-century Dutch jurists
21st-century Dutch politicians